Morgus Watson (born  March 1, 1961), better known by his ring name Morgus the Maniac is an American professional wrestler who has competed on the Mid-Atlantic and Southeastern independent promotions including the Eastern Wrestling Alliance, Mid-Eastern Wrestling Federation, National Wrestling League/House of Pain Wrestling Federation and Extreme Championship Wrestling and also wrestled as a preliminary wrestler for World Championship Wrestling during the early 1990s.

While competing in an interpromotional show with Extreme Championship Wrestling, then Eastern Championship Wrestling, which included former WWF wrestlers such as Mr. Hughes, Junkyard Dog, Greg "the Hammer" Valentine and Jake "the Snake" Roberts, he would lose his MEWF Heavyweight title to Lucifer the Knight of the Road on November 14, 1993.

In 2004, he appeared in the National Wrestling League's interpromotional "Lord of the Rings" tournament which included wrestlers from the NWL/HoPWF, NWA UK Hammerlock as well as former WWF, ECW and independent wrestlers.

Championships and accomplishments
All-American Wrestling Federation
AAWF Heavyweight Championship (1 time)
Atlantic Terror Championship Wrestling
ATCW Heavyweight Championship (1 time)
Maryland Championship Wrestling
MCW Hall of Fame (Class of 2010)
Mid-Eastern Wrestling Federation
MEWF Heavyweight Championship (3 times)
MEWF Mid-Atlantic Championship (3 times)
National Wrestling League/House of Pain Wrestling Federation
HoPWF Heavyweight Championship (1 time)
NWL/HoPWF Heavyweight Championship (1 time)
NWL/HoPWF Tag Team Championship (2 times) with "Diamond" Dave Donovan and Nikolai Volkoff
NWL Tag Team Championship (2 times) with Hard Rock Hamilton and Buzz Stryker/Axl Rotten
Pro Wrestling Illustrated
PWI ranked him # 500 of the 500 best singles wrestlers of the PWI 500 in 1992 
PWI ranked him # 184 of the 500 best singles wrestlers of the PWI 500 in 1993
UWF Hardcore Wrestling
UWF Hardcore Championship (1 time)

References

General
Conner, Floyd. Wrestlings Most Wanted: The Top 10 Book of Pro Wrestling's Outrageous Performers, Punishing Piledrivers and Other Oddities. Dulles, Virginia: Brassey's, 2001. 
Specific

Further reading
Powell, Camille. "In This Ring, A Good Cause; Wrestlers Don't Fake Intentions".  Washington Post.  30 April 1998
Berselli, Beth. "Led by Midgets and Maniacs, Pro Wrestlers Grip Patuxent Fans".  Washington Post.  10 Dec 1998

External links
NWL/HoPWF Profile: Morgus the Maniac

1961 births
Living people
American male professional wrestlers
People from Baltimore